Nutsa Kukhianidze (born 8 August 1983) is a Georgian actress. She appeared in more than twelve films since 1998.

Selected filmography

References

External links 

1983 births
Living people
Film actresses from Georgia (country)